Imperia is a statue at the entrance of the harbour of Konstanz, Germany, commemorating the Council of Constance that took place there between 1414 and 1418. It was created by Peter Lenk and clandestinely erected in 1993. The erection of the statue caused controversy, but it was on the private property of a rail company that did not object to its presence. Eventually, it became a widely-known landmark of Konstanz.

Imperia shows a woman holding two men on her hands. Although the two men resemble Pope Martin V (elected during the council) and Emperor Sigismund (who called the council), and they wear the papal tiara and imperial crown, Lenk has stated that these figures "are not the Pope and not the Emperor, but fools who have acquired the insignia of secular and spiritual power. And to what extent the real popes and emperors were also fools, I leave to the historical education of the viewer."

The statue refers to a short story by Balzac, "La Belle Impéria". The story is a harsh satire of the Catholic clergy's morals, where Imperia seduces cardinals and princes at the Council of Constance and has power over them all. The historical Imperia that served as the source material of Balzac's story was a well-educated Italian courtesan who died in 1512, nearly 100 years after the council, and never visited Konstanz.

References

Further reading 
 Helmut Weidhase: Imperia. Konstanzer Hafenfigur.  Konstanz: Stadler 1997.

External links 

 "Imperia im Hafen Konstanz" . Peter Lenk (sculptor). Retrieved February 22, 2017.
 Text of Les contes drolatiques by Balzac, including "La belle Impéria"
 3D-model of Imperia

1993 establishments in Germany
1993 sculptures
Buildings and structures in Konstanz (district)
Concrete sculptures in Germany
Outdoor sculptures in Germany
Sculptures of men in Germany
Sculptures of women in Germany
Statues in Germany
Seduction
German satire
Colossal statues
Sculptures in Baden-Württemberg